Kasprowicz is a Polish-language surname. It is a patronymic surname derived from the given name Kacper. Notable people with this surname include:

 Jan Kasprowicz (1860 - 1926), a poet, playwright, critic and translator
 Michael Kasprowicz (born 1972, Brisbane, Queensland), an Australian Test cricketer
Simon Kasprowicz,  Australian professional rugby union player

References

Polish-language surnames
Patronymic surnames
Surnames from given names